Bero Chandio,, Pakistan is one of the oldest villages of Sindh and dates back to Samma Dynasty. The village got much attention when the British Empire built a railway station, Bero Chandio railway station.

In the village, Chandio are living .

Boys high school present named Government Haji Rais Dur Muhammad Khan High School Bero Chandio, Girls Primary School, Boys Primary School as well.

People's Primary Healthcare Initiative Sindh (PPHI Sindh) hospital as well. The main crops of the village are rice, wheat, mustard, chickpea, in fruits guava is widely popular.

The village is widely popular for Burn Bricks which are sent to all its surroundings.
Notable Persons:Rais Nazir  Khan Chandio and Rais Munir  Khan Chandio

References

Populated places in Sindh